Paul Lemeteyer (Nantes, 4 June 1942) was a French professional road bicycle racer.

Major results

1964
Paris - Ezy
1965
Camors
1966
Nantes
Ploeuc
1967
Tour de France:
Winner stage 21
1968
Concarneau
Trofeo Jaumendreu
1969
Saint-Clet
St Ciet
Pleyber-Christ

External links 

Official Tour de France results for Paul Lemetayer

French male cyclists
1942 births
Living people
French Tour de France stage winners
Cyclists from Nantes